Microchip implant can refer to:
 Microchip implant (animal)
 Microchip implant (human)